CX 30 Radio Nacional is a Uruguayan Spanish language AM radio station that broadcasts from Montevideo, Uruguay.

History
This radio station was established in 1925.

References

External links
 

Spanish-language radio stations
Radio in Uruguay
Mass media in Montevideo
Radio stations established in 1925
1925 establishments in Uruguay